, is a Japanese anime series produced by Toei Animation as the tenth installment in Izumi Todo's Pretty Cure metaseries, featuring the eighth generation of Cures. The series is produced by Hiroaki Shibata, who produced Digimon Data Squad  and written by Ryōta Yamaguchi, who wrote the scripts for The Vision of Escaflowne. Character designs were handled by Akira Takahashi, who previously did the designs for Suite PreCure. The series aired on the ANN network between February 3, 2013 and January 26, 2014, replacing Smile PreCure! in its initial timeslot, and was succeeded by HappinessCharge PreCure!. An animated film based on the series was released on October 26, 2013. This series' main topic revolves around love, emotions, selflessness and selfishness, with playing card suits for the cure's main motifs.

Saban Brands, under its SCG Characters unit, produced an English dub of the series, Glitter Force: Doki Doki, abridging the original forty-nine episodes into thirty. Despite the Glitter Force trademark having moved to Toei in June 2017, Saban Brands was still credited with production of the English dub. The first fifteen episodes began streaming on Netflix from August 18, 2017. The second season, also consisting of fifteen episodes, was released on November 10, 2017. It is the third installment of the series to receive an English dub, and the second English adaptation under the Glitter Force brand, and the last to be dubbed by Saban Brands. Hasbro and eOne currently owns the rights and names to the program and the brand alongside other Saban Brands entertainment assets as of June 14, 2018.

Plot
 is a magical world where everyone's hearts live happily with the guidance of their ruler Princess Marie Ange. However, one day, an evil force known as the Jikochu (Saban: Mercenares) attacks the kingdom. A warrior who served Marie Ange goes to the human world with her pixie partner to find the missing princess, and they bring a trio of young pixies along to find the special girls who can be granted magical powers to help save the kingdom.

Sharuru (Saban: Kippie), one of the pixies, finds an enthusiastic middle-school girl named Mana (Saban: Maya) during a visit to the Clover Tower. Mana is joined by her friends to form the magical girl Precure team.

Characters
The characters names and terminology are presented from the assumed Japanese translations. The Saban version is as shown in the Netflix English dub.

DokiDoki Pretty Cure
The title characters are a team of girls who become the magical Pretty Cure. They derive their powers by collecting pins known as Glitter Charms which they place in a smartphone-like device called the Magical Lovely Pad. When transforming into their magical form, they shout  and trace out the letters L-O-V-E on their devices. Charms can be added to enhance their powers. In later episodes, the girls upgrade to use the Love Heart Arrow and the Magical Lovely Pad to execute more powerful purification attacks. They introduce themselves with the phrase: "Listen to the heartbeat of love! DokiDoki! Pretty Cure!".

 / 

She has short dark pink hair and pink eyes. She is always looking to help others, often jumping in without thinking of the consequences. Her family owns a local yoshoku restaurant called .
 As Cure Heart, Mana has long bright yellow blond hair styled in a ponytail. Her theme color is pink and her playing card motif is the Heart. Her transformation catchphrase is "Overflowing love! Cure Heart!"

 / 

 Rikka Hishikawa is Mana's 15-year-old best friend since moving into her neighborhood ten years ago. She has long blue hair and blue eyes, and sometimes wears red glasses. At school, Rikka is the student council secretary, and is ranked among the top ten in the country in performing on the national mock exams. She often tries to keep Mana from going crazy. She says she is not athletic and is usually the last to be picked for a sports team. Her father is a photographer who travels a lot so Rikka writes him letters.
 As Cure Diamond, Rikka partners with the pixie Raquel, her hair transforms into a light blue color with a long ponytail. Her attacks are icy blasts that freeze her opponents. Her theme color is blue and her playing card motif is the Diamond. Her transformation catchphrase is "The light of wisdom! Cure Diamond!!"()

 / 

 Alice Yotsuba has brown hair styled in buns and brown eyes. She is 13 years old and an old friend of Mana and Rikka, having known them from elementary school when she was little and the two girls would defend her from being picked on by bullies. She comes from a wealthy family which owns Clover Tower and many businesses in town, and she attends the prestigious Private Nanatsubashi Academy.
 Having learnt martial arts from her grandfather as a child, she came to fear her own strength due to the time in elementary school when she fought off the bullies and then made a vow not to ever fight again. She first learns of the Pretty Cure from the security footage from Clover Tower that recorded Mana transforming. At first, she is willing only to provide a supporting role to the team and not fight because of her vow, but she comes to the realization that it is important to fight to protect those dearest to her.  In the beauty contest episode, the girls try to keep Alice from losing her temper, knowing she had a short and furious one when she was younger.
As Cure Rosetta, Alice gains longer hair that is tinted orange and tied in two long, curly ponytails. Her pixie partner is Lance. Going with her desire to protect, her power largely revolves around producing protective barriers. Her theme color is yellow and her playing card is the Clover. Her transformation catchphrase is ""The warmth of the sun! Cure Rosetta!"

 / 

Makoto Kenzaki is the 14-year-old Royal Songstress of Trump Kingdom as well as the last of the previous generation of magical warriors until Mana and the other girls became the Pretty Cure. She has a strong sense of responsibility toward the princess of Trump Kingdom, Marie Ange. When the kingdom is invaded by the Jikochu, leaving Makoto as the last remaining warrior, she and Marie Ange became separated during their escape. Arriving in the human world and becoming determined to find Marie Ange, Makoto takes on a human alias and becomes a pop singer/celebrity/idol in the hopes that her voice will one day reach the princess.
 Whilst initially reluctant to work with the other girls, Makoto soon opens up to them and reveals her identity to them, accepting their offer to help her find the missing princess, and later enrolling in Mana and Rikka's school. Her pixie partner is Davi. Having come from another world, she is generally unfamiliar with a lot of the local customs.
As Cure Sword, Makoto's true Trump Kingdom form, her dark purple hair changes to a lighter purple and grows into a ponytail. Her theme color is purple and her card motif is the Spade. Her transformation catchphrase is "The blade of courage! Cure Sword!"

 / 

 Aguri Madoka is a mysterious 10-year-old fourth-grader who first appears in Japanese episode 22 when she protects the heroines from Regina. She is generally levelheaded and wise, often lecturing the other girls and pushing them to become stronger. Despite keeping up a stern demeanor most of the time, she has a fondness for sweet foods. Aguri is also very fond of Ai and treats her like a little sister.
Aguri became a Pretty Cure before the events of the series, separated from Ai after being defeated by the Jikochu, and she does not remember anything before encounter with her grandmother, Mari. After the Royal Crystals were gathered, Aguri is reunited with Ai and resumes her duties. It is later revealed that Aguri is actually the personified goodness of Marie Ange and believes that she is destined to fight Regina, her older sister. Her pixie partner is Ai.
 As Cure Ace, Aguri's transformation lasts for 5 minutes, but in episode 45, when she touches the Eternal Golden Crown, she gains unlimited transformation, which also causes her hair to turn red and her appearance to change into a young adult/teenager. Unlike the other girls, Cure Ace transforms using the  provided by Ai, using the transformation phrase . Her theme color is red and her card motif is the Ace card. Her transformation catchphrase is "The trump card of love! Cure Ace!"

Trump Kingdom
Characters from the magical world of :

 

 Sharuru is a pink rabbit-like pixie who partners with Mana.  She is the sole female leader of the three triplet pixies, and the most passionate and outgoing. She is named after Charles, the King of Hearts in the traditional Paris court card name of playing cards. She assumes a human form resembling Mana.

 Raquel is a blue dog-like pixie who is one of the triplets along with Sharuru and Lance. He is named after Rikka, the Queen of Diamonds. He also assumes a human form, resembling an elementary school boy in the original Japanese version.

 

 Lance is a yellow bear-like pixie and one of the pixie triplets. He is a little spoiled. He is named after Lancelot, the Knave of Clubs. He also assumes a human form, resembling a young boy with curly hair.

 

 Davi is a purple-colored cat-like pixie who partners with Makoto. Davi is very independent, but she often worries about her partner and often has the habit of voicing out her true feelings, much to her embarrassment. Davi can transform into an adult human girl, acting in the role of Makoto's manager. She is named after David, the King of Spades.

 A salesman who gives Mana her Cure Lovead. He wears a hat and has blond hair. He had a knick-knack booth near the Clover Tower, and then opens a shop in the neighborhood. In the finale, Jonathan becomes the president after the kingdom becomes a republic.

 

The princess of the Trump Kingdom, who often enjoyed Makoto's performances and treated her like a sister. When the Trump Kingdom was attacked by the Jikochu, it took nearly all her power to seal the Jikochu King into a deep slumber. After sending Sharuru and the other fairies to earth, she escaped the Trump Kingdom alongside Cure Sword but got separated from her friend with Bel attempting to turn her into a Jikochu. This forces Marie to split her psyche into Regina and Aguri, who respectively embody her love for her father and their kingdom, with her body transformed into the egg from which Ai emerges. Everyone assumed Marie was frozen until Aguri revealed the truth with Mana attempting to stop her and Regina from killing each other. Ultimately, Marie Ange's disembodied spirit explains that the process cannot be reversed and goes into the afterlife to join her mother, but her soul will live on through her splintered selves.

 

A mysterious winged baby that hatched from a large egg Joe found and came in contact with Mana and the others. She has various magic abilities, some of which are used based on her mood with others helping to power up the PreCure. She also has her own set of Cure Loveads that are used with the Lovely Commune to look after her, such as milk bottles.
 After Aguri's appearance, Ai is revealed to be her partner, having helped her gain the ability to transform into Cure Ace using the Love Eyes Palette before the story begins. Prior to the story, Aguri was defeated by the Jikochu King, which led to Ai being reverted to an egg and becoming separated from her. She is later reunited with Aguri after the Royal Crystals are gathered. She initially lives with Joe, but later uses her magic to convince Mana's family that she is her sister and stays at her house. While Ai explains she was sent by Marie to serve as a shield that weakens a Jikochu's influence, causing the opposite effect when in a bad mood, she is revealed to created from Marie's body after she splintered her psyche. Ai's motif is based on the cupid.

Jikochu 
The  Desired by an ancient darkness possessing the King of Trump Kingdom, their goal is to turn all feelings into hatred and selfish desires into  to revive their leader the Jikochu King and create more of their kind. Each of the Leaders and Generals represent one of the Seven Deadly Sins.

Leaders 
 
 (Japanese); Patrick Seitz (English)
 The leader of the Jikochu, he would later be revealed to be Marie Ange's father: . Treasuring his daughter, King Trump's resolve to cure Marie Ange resulting in him being possessed by the Proto Jikochu and compelled by the entity into siring an army of Jikochu from his subjects before his daughter sealed him in stone. But the Jikochu Agents work to revive King Jikochu by getting the energy from people's psyches, eventually reviving him to invade Earth. It was revealed that King Trump King still exists with King Jikochu, with Marie Ange's incarnation extracting him before the Precure destroy King Jikochu with only a fragment containing the Proto Jikochu remaining. In the aftermath, King Trump retires with Joe Okada made the president of the Trump Kingdom. King Jikochu represents the sin of Pride.

 
 (Japanese); Ray Chase (English)
An evil entity sealed within the Golden Crown by three legendary Precure ten millennia years prior. But the seal was accidentally broken by King Trump when he uses its power to cure his daughter Marie Ange, with the Proto Jikochu possessing the king who is converted into his host - King Jikochu. When King Jikochu was destroyed, the Proto Jikochu takes Bel as his new body before being killed for good by Cure Heart Pantheon Mode. The Proto Jikochu represents the original sin.

 

A mysterious, mischievous, spoiled and demanding blonde-haired girl who serves as the Jikochu Trio's second-in-command while claiming to be King Jikochu's daughter. She is actually a personification of Marie Ange's inner darkness, embodying her original incarnation's desire to protect her father, with the ability to create Jikochu from selfless people. She also possessed for a brief time a red Royal Crystal that changed her personality into a more cruel and violent one with red eyes. But after befriending Mana and the other girls, Regina begins to reconsider her group's actions. Infuriated by her "betrayal," her father brainwashes her back into the fold completely, with a different colored outfit, and a different selfish personality. After receiving wounds and injuries from Cure Ace, Regina was put to sleep/suspended animation to rejuvenate her. In episode 38, Regina awakens, and returns to lead the Jikochu Trio. In episode 39, she takes the Miracle Dragon Glaive after her feelings reached her father which turned the glaive light into the power of darkness. During the final battle, Regina's origins are revealed as she eventually remembers her friendship with Mana and the other Cures. She decides to switch sides and allies with the Pretty Cure to save King Trump and stop King Jikochu. At the end of the series, Regina turns over a new leaf and becomes an ally to the Pretty Cure, and starts attending Mana's school. While Regina is Latin for Queen, she represents the sin of Lust.

Commanders 
The Jikochu Agents were previously composed of seven members, each an embodiment of the Seven Deadly Sins.

 The leader of the Jikochu Trio that faces the Pretty Cure early in the series. He is a bearded man who wears sunglasses. After killing off Leva and Gula for their Janergy, Bel fashions Blood Rings to force Ira and Marmo into serving him. But Bel later loses the Blood Rings when they are destroyed by the Pretty Cure while deposed by Regina's return. In the finale, though he intended to gain a new power by eating a surviving fragment of King Jikochu, Bel ends up becoming a vessel for the Proto Jikochu and is purified back into his true form, a rat with bat wings, upon the monster's death. His name is derived from Belphegor, the demon representing Sloth.

 

 A bossy woman who wears an asymmetrical outfit: half of it is a sleeveless dress, and the other half is made of heavy winter clothes. She has long bluish-white hair, yellow eyes, and also has bat wings behind her ears. She can also consume the dark hearts that would have been formed into Jikochu, and transform into a powerful monster. In the finale, she and Ira surrendered as they fled after the defeat of Proto Jikochu. Her name is derived from Marmon, the demon representing Greed.

 

He has short bluish-white hair, yellow eyes, and black bat wings behind his ears. He has a short temper. In episode 26, he fell in love with Rikka after being treated by her when he is struck by lightning. In the finale, he and Marmo surrendered as they fled after the defeat of Proto Jikochu. His name is Latin for Wrath.

A deputy of the Jikochu. He is a bearded man who wears makeup and a top hat. He speaks in a very effeminate language and refers to Bel with the suffix "-chan". In episode 31, after being defeated by the Lovely Straight Flush in their combined form, Leva is killed alongside Gula by Bel for his Janergy. His name is derived from Leviathan, the demon representing Envy.

A deputy of the Jikochu. A hulking and muscular man with very sharp teeth who likes to eat everything, able to bite through anything like Cure Rosetta's shield. In episode 31, after being defeated by the Lovely Straight Flush in their combined form, Gula is killed alongside Leva by Bel for his Janergy.

Grunts
 

 Monsters generated out of the selfish thoughts a person's heart, speaking in their voice with varying forms. The PreCure use their attacks to defeat the Jikochu, purifying the Psyche into a heart with angel wings as it enters to its owner.

Other recurring characters

 

 The chief butler who looks after Alice. He is an old gentleman with a big white moustache. He knows of the girls' secret identities as magical girls, and assists them by providing intel and containing any leaks of their existence to the public.

Mana's father who runs the Pigtail Restaurant as a chef.

Mana's mother who runs the Pigtail Restaurant and handles orders.

Mana's grandfather who often argues with Kentaro over who the better cook is.

 A vain girl with blond hair and red eyes. She comes from a wealthy family and has known Alice since elementary school as a rival. She is supported by three minions.

 The headroom teacher of Oogai First Middle School.

Movie characters

The man carrying the flute. He proclaimed himself as "the king of the world of memories" and somehow developed hatred towards Mana. He also detest humans who throw old things away for new and desired to trap everyone into their past for eternity. It is later revealed that he's actually , Mana's beloved dog who died in a car accident.

A woman based on the harlequin created from mannequins. She is one of Marsh's servants.

A clock-like creature created from the grandfather clock. He is one of Marsh's servants.

A skeletal biker created from the engine and bike. He is one of Marsh's servants.

A mysterious fairy who helped the fairies to save Mana and everyone and stop Marsh. Her true identity is unknown to everyone but in the end, she's actually Mana's late grandmother, .

A demon who resembles a clarinet and is the mastermind behind the schemes. At first, it's the clarinet that Marsh carrying. After Marsh unable to destroy Mana, Clarinet took the lead and attempt to destroy the future. It is later defeated by Cure Heart in her Engage Mode.

Media

Anime

The series aired on ABC and other ANN stations between February 3, 2013 and January 26, 2014. Marvelous AQL began releasing the series on DVD from May 29, 2013 and on Blu-ray Disc from September 27, 2013.

Saban Brands under its SCG Characters unit produced an English dub of the series, titled Glitter Force: Doki Doki. The English dub abridged the original forty-nine episodes into thirty. The first season was released on Netflix on August 18, 2017, comprising 15 episodes and covering multiple languages. Doki Doki is the second series to be released under the Glitter Force brand following Toei's acquisition of the trademark from Saban Brands. However, Saban Brands was still credited with the production of the English dub. The show is currently licensed by Hasbro.

Films
The DokiDoki Pretty Cures made their theatrical debut in the Pretty Cure All Stars film, which was released in Japanese theatres on March 16, 2013, with an official soundtrack released on March 13, 2013. A film based on the series, titled , was released on October 26, 2013 as well as the official soundtrack on October 23, 2013.

Music
The series uses three pieces of theme music, one opening theme and two ending themes. The opening theme is composed by Chiho Kiyooka, the ending themes by Dr.Usui and the background music by Hiroshi Takaki. A character song album featuring songs performed by Kanako Miyamoto (as Cure Sword), titled "Songbird", was released by Marvelous AQL on May 29, 2013, alongside the original soundtrack's first volume, Pretty Cure Sound Love Link.

The first vocal soundtrack titled  was released on July 17, 2013. The second vocal album for the series entitled ~100% PRECURE DAYS☆~ was released on November 6, 2013. Then on November 20, the second original soundtrack for the series was released under the title Pretty Cure Sound Arrow. On January 15, 2014, the vocal best album for the series was released.

For Glitter Force: Doki Doki, Noam Kaniel (Noam) (who worked on X-Men, Code Lyoko, W.I.T.C.H., Power Rangers, Digimon Fusion, Miraculous Ladybug & Glitter Force) composed the "Glitter Force: Doki Doki Theme Song" and it was performed by the Asian girl group Blush, who previously performed the Glitter Force theme song, which is a remix of the original, and some lyrics were replaced.

Manga
A manga adaptation by Futago Kamikita began serialization in Kodansha's Nakayoshi magazine in March 2013 and ended in February 2014.

Merchandise
Merchandise of the anime were also issued during the series's initial run including bags, watches, raincoats, etc. Several toys featuring the Cure's transformation devices and weapons were also released by Bandai during the series' airing.

Video games
The characters in the series appear in the dancing video game, which was released for the Wii in Japan on March 28, 2013. A game based on the series, was released by Bandai for Nintendo 3DS on August 1, 2013.

References

It was not supported for Hasbro.

Further reading
DokiDoki! PreCure Official Complete Book (March 15, 2014), Gakken.

External links
  at Netflix
 Toei Animation's Dokidoki!  PreCure site 
 ABC's Dokidoki!  PreCure site 
 

2013 anime television series debuts
2014 Japanese television series endings
2014 comics endings
Pretty Cure
Toei Animation television
Television series by Saban Capital Group
Magical girl anime and manga
TV Asahi original programming
Toei Animation films
Netflix original anime
Netflix children's programming
Television series by Hasbro Studios
Angels in television